Jabuka (which means apple in Croatian) is an uninhabited volcanic island in the Adriatic Sea, west of the island of Vis. It is part of the Dalmatian archipelago. The closest land masses are the small islands of Svetac and Brusnik. Jabuka is the farthest from the nearest land mass out of all Croatian islands.

Flora and fauna

Its coast is steep and difficult to approach, and landings can be made only when the weather is clear. The easiest access is on the south-west side. On the island, noteworthy species such as a Dalmatian Wall Lizard and some plants (Centaurea jabukensis and Centaurea crithmifolia, both Asteraceae) are protected endemics. In 1958 the island was declared a geological monument of nature. The surrounding sea is rich with fish, especially sea bream. However, due to remoteness, lack of safe harbor, strong currents, and sudden changes of weather, fishermen have traditionally avoided the waters around Jabuka.

Geological features
All sea lanes avoid the island, because its magnetic form confuses compasses. Due to its iron-rich rock, Jabuka is frequently struck by lightning.

The area around the island is prone to earthquakes due to the Jabuka–Andrija Fault. In 2003, the island was struck by a long series of earthquakes, the largest of which was  5.5. Another series occurred in 2004–05 with a 5.2 quake. However, due to Jabuka's remoteness, these earthquakes are weakly felt on the Croatian mainland and inhabited islands.

References

Bibliography

Islets of Croatia
Islands of the Adriatic Sea
Landforms of Split-Dalmatia County
Uninhabited islands of Croatia
Magnetic anomalies
Volcanic islands